KEYS (1440 AM) is a radio station serving the Corpus Christi, Texas area with a news/talk format. It is licensed to Malkan AM Associates, L.P.

History

On September 1, 2011 KEYS changed their format to sports, branded as "ESPN 1440" with programming from ESPN Radio. As of August 31, 2015, the Talk Radio Format had returned to KEYS after 4-year absence. In the 60s when it was top 40s air staff included Johnny Ringo, Charlie Brite, Johnny Marks, Tom Nix, Gil Garcia as Michael Scott, Jim West. Studio then where located in two locations in Downtown Corpus Christi.

External links
KEYS 1440 official website

News and talk radio stations in the United States
EYS
Radio stations established in 2011